Teenage Dads are an Australian four-piece indie rock band from the Mornington Peninsula, Victoria, who formed in 2015. The group consists of Jordan Finlay (vocals, guitar), Connor McLaughlin (guitar), Vincent Kinna (drums) and Angus Christie (bass). They signed to Chugg Music in 2021, and have released three extended plays – most recently Club Echo (2022) – and one studio album, Potpourri Lake (2018). In 2022, their single "Teddy" polled at number 63 in the Triple J Hottest 100.

History 
Teenage Dads was formed by self-taught musicians Jordan Finlay and Connor McLaughlin in Mount Eliza, Mornington Peninsula, Victoria in 2015, with Angus Christie and Vincent Kinna joining the band later. Meeting in their final years of high school, they played their first show in 2017.

In September 2017, they released their five-track debut EP, Wett Weather. Their debut studio album, Potpourri Lake, was released on 26 October 2018. It is described by the band as "mixed bag of sorts", with it "not sticking to genre clichés". "Sunburnt", the third single from the album, was the first from the band to receive airplay on Triple J. In May 2019, the band released their second EP, Red.

The band signed with Chugg Music in April 2021. Three singles were released in anticipation for the band's third EP – "Thank You for the Honey, Honey" (September 2020) and "Cheerleader" (July 2021) – "Piano Girl" was released alongside the full record, Club Echo, in November. They cited the Strokes and Phoenix as influences for the record, which thematically "centres around the last five years of our lives as a band".

In 2022, the band distributed three singles promoting their upcoming project. "Exit Sign" was released in April, described by Ellie Robinson of NME as featuring "bright, jangly lead guitars and clicky drums with heartfelt, warmly sung vocal runs and a soulful, buzzing bassline". "Teddy" and "Hey, Diego!" followed in August and November respectively.

In February 2023, the band announced the forthcoming release of Midnight Driving. Upon release, the band said "The EP is about perspective. How things look from one point of view, and how they can change over time from another outlook. The songs feel like diary entries, documented internally, like conversations you have with yourself when you go midnight driving. A constant, internal form of therapy almost."

Band members 
Current members
 Jordan Finlay – lead vocals, keyboards, rhythm guitar
 Vincent Kinna – drums, backing vocals
 Connor McLaughlin – lead guitar, backing vocals
 Angus Christie – bass guitar, backing vocals

Former members
 Reece Pellow – lead guitar

Discography

Studio albums

Extended plays

Singles

Tours 
Headlining
 Ready Teddy Go! Tour, 2022
 Exit Sign Tour, 2022
 Midnight Driving Tour, 2023

Supporting
 Lime Cordiale – 14 Steps To a Better You Tour, 2022
 Spacey Jane – Here Comes Everybody Tour, 2022

References 

Rock music groups
Australian rock music groups
Australian indie rock groups
Musical quartets
Musical groups established in 2015